"Silkkii" is a single by Finnish reggae artist Jukka Poika, from his fourth studio album Yhdestä puusta. It was released on 23 May 2011 as a digital download in Finland. The song peaked at number one on the Finnish Singles Chart.

Track listing

Chart performance

Release history

References

2011 singles
Jukka Poika songs
Number-one singles in Finland